"Pay for the Printer" is a science fiction short story by American writer Philip K. Dick. It was first published in Satellite Science Fiction, in October 1956. Manuscript dated January 28, 1954.

Plot 

In a war-ravaged future, humanity has come to depend on an alien species known as the Biltongs, possessed of the ability to replicate items identically – although the copies only last for a short time. When the Biltongs become decrepit, the humans are forced to rediscover the skill of building.

Synopsis 
The earth is devastated after a conflict involving the explosion of  H-bombs There are very few remnants of civilization and the lands are devastated due to the fact it doesnt rain anymore. 
Allen Fergesson is a member of the Pittsburg colony, the story begins in his car where he's with Charlotte, a member of a decaying colonie where the Biltbong is sick, and a mysterious man they picked up on the road. When they arrive at the colony everything is falling appart, they meet Ben trying to fuel his car at the gas station. They pick him up and then go to Charlotte's appartement but there are cracks all over the walls and wobbly scaffolding surrounds the building. She tries to gets in building but a structure falls on her, nobody is competent and the workers are only voluntary civilians. After finding new clothes for Charlotte which have turned to ashes they arrive at the Biltbong which is formed of a yellow protoplasm topped by pseudopodias. Inside there's a core made of filaments. The alien seems tired and is surrounded by empty eggs, indeed the Biltbongs have become sterile after they stay on Earth. Allen presents to the alien originals object that weren't previously duplicated in hopes of bringing him life again, but it fails. The crowd surrounding them becomes agitated when they see Allen's brand new car and a riot breaks out. Ben and Charlotte get away with the car. Allen end up with the mysterious man who we discover is named Jhon Dawes, a survivor of the Chigaco colony who felt appart due to the death of their Biltbong. He shows to Allen a mug of wood he made along with a primitive knife and shares with him the importance of handcrafting instead of duplicating.

Interpretation 
Bradley Robert Arthur Congdon makes the case that "Pay for the Printer" is a critique "of the culture of consumerism and mass production." Congdon connects Dick's story to a left wing analysis of the failings of capitalism, writing that, "it is not much of a stretch to see that a Marxian idea of alienation is at work, where mankind is so alienated from its labour that the possibility of survival is hamstrung."

References

Short stories by Philip K. Dick
1956 short stories
Works originally published in Satellite Science Fiction